Haven of Hope Hospital, located in Rennie's Mill, New Territories, Hong Kong, provides subacute medical care, comprehensive rehabilitation and long term care under the auspices of Haven of Hope Christian Service and the Hospital Authority. The hospital was founded by Norwegian missionary Annie Skau Berntsen in 1955.

References

Hospitals in Hong Kong
1955 establishments in Hong Kong
Hospitals established in 1955
Sai Kung District